Tonghua County is a county in the southwest of Jilin province, China, bordering Liaoning province to the west.

Administrative divisions

Towns:
Kuaidamao, Guosong, Ermi, Ying'ebu, Xinglin, Sankeyushu, Jiangdian, Shihu, Guanghua, Da'an

Townships:
Fujiang Township, Donglai Township, Sipeng Township, Daquanyuan Manchu and Korean Ethnic Township, Jindou Korean and Manchu Ethnic Township

Climate

References

External links

County-level divisions of Jilin